Converse Airport  is a public airport  west of Converse, in Miami County, Indiana. The airport was founded in October 1944 as one of 26 satellite airfields for Bunker Hill Naval Air Station. The town of Converse gained control of the field in November 1947 after the Navy abandoned the field when the war ended.

References

External links 

 http://www.airfields-freeman.com/IN/Airfields_IN_N.htm#converse
 http://airnav.com/airport/1I8

Airports in Indiana
Transportation buildings and structures in Miami County, Indiana